The Council of Ministers is the collective decision-making body of the Government of Jersey, formed by the Ministers of the States of Jersey and the Chief Minister. The council co-ordinates policies and administration, especially policy affecting two or more ministers, prioritises executive and legislative proposals, and presents a "Strategic Plan for Jersey" for approval by the States Assembly.

The Government of Jersey is the executive and administrative arm of the States of Jersey and the identity used by the Council of Ministers for these purposes. All ministers in the council are appointed by, and must be, members of the States. The council does not represent a parliamentary majority as ministers may be elected on a variety of manifestos. The executive is prevented from constituting a majority of the 51 elected members by the States of Jersey Law 2005, which places a legal cap of 22 on the number of states' members who may hold office as chief minister, minister and assistant ministers.

The first Council of Ministers was established in December 2005. Before then, the executive powers of the States of Jersey were managed by a committee-based system of States members.

Constitution 
The ministerial system of government in Jersey was established by the States of Jersey Law 2005. Part 4 establishes the role and election of Ministers.

There are at least 8 members of the Council - the Chief Minister and 7 other ministers.

The functions of the council is:

 to co-ordinate the policies and administration for which they are responsible as Ministers
 to discuss and agree policy which affects 2 or more of them
 to discuss and agree their common policy regarding external relations
 to prioritise executive and legislative proposals
 to agree and, within 4 months of their appointment, lodge for referral to one or more Scrutiny Panels, a statement of their common strategic policy
 such other matters as the Chief Minister or the Council of Ministers may determine

Ministers provide policy direction to Government officers, having given fair considering to those officers' informed and impartial advice.

Present composition 
The current Council of Ministers was selected by the States Assembly on Monday 11 July 2022. All of the candidates nominated by newly-elected Chief Minister, Deputy Kristina Moore, were backed by States Members.

Only the International Development Minister, Deputy Carolyn Labey, retained her role from the previous government. Deputy Ian Gorst, who served as External Relations Minister under John Le Fondré's premiership, kept his place on the Council of Ministers but in a new role overseeing the Treasury.

Deputies Kristina Moore and Philip Ozouf both returned to the government after a four-year absence, while six of the 2022 cohort of Ministers were new to politics.

All of the Ministers and Assistant Ministers are independent politicians, apart from Assistant Social Security Minister, Deputy Malcolm Ferey, who is a member of the Jersey Liberal Conservatives.

Appointment of ministers 
The States Assembly elects a member for appointment as Chief Minister after every ordinary election of deputies and whenever the Chief Minister is not able to continue to fulfil their role. The Chief Minister, or any other States member, then may nominate members for appointment as Ministers. From those nominations, States members then elect members into each ministerial office. The Chief Minister or a Minister are in office until the next appointment to their role, or until they resign  or are dismissed by the Chief Minister.

The States Assembly can hold a vote of no confidence in the Government and the Chief Minister, or any individual Minister. This happened in December 2020, when Senator Kristina Moore lodged a vote of no confidence in the Chief Minister over a controversy involving the Chief Executive of the Government, Charlie Parker. The proposition was lost 29 votes contre, 19 votes pour, with the Education Minister abstaining.

Chief Minister 
The Chief Minister acts as president of the council and matters may be brought for discussion by any minister. The Chief Minister may not be a Minister or Assistant Minister.

The functions of the Chief Minister with regard to the council are:

 to co-ordinate the discharge of common functions of the Council
 to conduct external relations with the common policy agreed by the Council

Operation 

Legally ultimate responsibility for the policy decisions of a department rest solely with the minister, however in practice matters are decided by a unanimous or majority vote of all the ministers. The Council of Ministers may require an individual minister to follow directs if a policy falls within the functions of the council and is in the public interest.

The minutes of Council meetings are drawn up and kept by the Office of the Greffier of the States.

Previous Councils

Frank Walker (2005–2008) 
Jersey's first Ministers were appointed in 2005, with Frank Walker becoming the first Chief Minister of Jersey.

Only one of the ten ministers he nominated to join his Council of Ministers failed to be elected, Senator Len Norman, whose position was filled by Deputy Guy de Faye.

Chief Minister of Jersey: Senator Frank Walker
Treasury Minister: Senator Terry Le Sueur 
Economic Development Minister: Senator Philip Ozouf 
Home Affairs Minister: Deputy Andrew Lewis (replaced Senator Wendy Kinnard)
Health and Social Services Minister: Senator Ben Shenton (replaced Senator Stuart Syvret)
Education, Sport and Culture Minister: Senator Mike Vibert 
Planning and Environment Minister: Senator Freddie Cohen
Housing Minister: Senator Terry Le Main 
Social Security Minister: Senator Paul Routier 
Transport and Technical Services Minister: Deputy Guy de Faye

Terry Le Sueur (2008–2011) 

Elections for ministerial posts were held on 11 and 12 December 2008. The nominees of the Chief Minister were successful with the exception of Senator Routier, proposed successively for Health and Social Services and Education, Sport and Culture. Three ministers subsequently resigned as ministers (but remained as States members) in the face of criticisms of their personal conduct: Senator Jim Perchard (2009), Deputy Terry Le Main (2010) and Deputy Sean Power (2011), triggering further elections. One minister, Senator Freddie Cohen, exchanged the role of Planning and Environment Minister for that of "foreign minister" in 2011.

Chief Minister of Jersey: Senator Terry Le Sueur
Treasury Minister:  Senator Philip Ozouf (elected with 38 votes; Deputy Geoff Southern received 13 votes)
Economic Development Minister: Senator Alan Maclean (elected with 32 votes; Deputy Mike Higgins received 20 votes)
Home Affairs Minister: Senator Ian Le Marquand (elected with 34 votes; Senator Stuart Syvret received 18 votes)
Health and Social Services Minister: Deputy Anne Pryke (from April 2009). Her predecessor, Senator Jim Perchard  (elected in 2008 with 31 votes; Senator Paul Routier receiving 21 votes) resigned in April 2009 after controversy surrounding remarks he made in the chamber urging Senator Stuart Syvret to commit suicide.
Education, Sport and Culture Minister: Deputy James Reed  (elected on the fourth round with 31 votes). Deputy Reed was the Chief Minister's initial candidate for the post. However, when his nomination of Senator Routier for Health and Social Services was defeated, he withdrew Deputy Reed's name and nominated Senator Routier in his place. Deputies Reed, Judy Martin and Roy Le Hérissier were also nominated. In the first round of voting Senator Routier received 16 votes, Deputy Reed 13 votes, Deputy Le Hérissier 12 votes and Deputy Martin 11 votes. With Deputy Martin eliminated, in the second round Deputy Le Hérissier received 20 votes while Senator Routier and Deputy Reed both received 16 votes. In the tie-breaking third round Deputy Reed received 29 votes and Senator Routier was eliminated with 23 votes. In the final round Deputy Reed was elected with 31 votes and Deputy Le Hérissier received 22 votes.
Planning and Environment Minister: Deputy Rob Duhamel (from July 2011). Senator Freddie Cohen, who was elected to the ministerial post unopposed in 2008, resigned in order to focus on his role as "foreign minister" (formally, as an assistant minister to the Chief Minister).
Housing Minister: Deputy Andrew Green (from February 2011). He replaced Deputy Sean Power, in post since June 2010, was resigned after he was "found to have broken the Data Protection Law by sending a confidential and personal email to a States colleague on to a third party". Power's predecessor had also resigned: Senator Terry Le Main, elected in 2008 with 27 votes (Senator Alan Breckon receiving 25 votes), stood down as minister in June 2010, following unproven allegations, which he vigorously denied, about his relationship with a property developer.
Social Security Minister:  Deputy Ian Gorst (elected with 36 votes; Deputy Geoff Southern received 16 votes)
Transport and Technical Services Minister: Constable Mike Jackson (elected with 33 votes; Deputy Rob Duhamel received 19 votes)

Ian Gorst's first term (2011–2014) 

Elections for ministerial posts were held on 17 and 18 November 2011. The chief minister's nominations were all contested; two of his nominations were defeated, and five ministerial posts were decided by margins of between 1 and 3 votes. The chief minister's nomination of Senator Ian Le Marquand to the Treasury was defeated, and so the chief minister amended his nomination for Home Affairs to retain Senator Le Marquand on the council, by withdrawing his nomination of Senator Lyndon Farnham. The chief minister's nomination of Connétable John Refault to Transport and Technical Services was defeated, with Deputy Kevin Lewis, a former Assistant Minister for Transport and Technical Services, being elected.

Chief Minister of Jersey: Senator Ian Gorst
Treasury and Resources Minister: Senator Philip Ozouf 
Economic Development Minister: Senator Alan Maclean
Home Affairs Minister and Deputy Chief Minister: Senator Ian Le Marquand
Health and Social Services Minister: Deputy Anne Pryke
Education, Sport and Culture Minister: Deputy Patrick Ryan
Planning and Environment Minister: Deputy Rob Duhamel
Housing Minister: Deputy Andrew Green
Social Security Minister: Senator Francis Le Gresley
Transport and Technical Services Minister: Deputy Kevin Lewis

Ian Gorst's second term (2014–2018) 
Chief Minister of Jersey: Senator Ian Gorst
Treasury and Resources Minister: Senator Alan Maclean
Economic Development Minister: Senator Lyndon Farnham
Home Affairs Minister: Deputy Kristina Moore
Health and Social Services Minister: Senator Andrew Green
Education, Sport and Culture Minister: Deputy Rod Bryans
Planning and Environment Minister: Deputy Steve Luce
Housing Minister: Deputy Anne Pryke
Social Security Minister: Deputy Susie Pinel
Transport and Technical Services Minister: Deputy Eddie Noel

John Le Fondré (2018–2022)
The Council of Ministers saw a number of changes during John Le Fondré's time as Chief Minister. Of his 2018 picks, several were no longer in office by the end of the electoral term.

On 12 December 2018, Senator Tracey Vallois resigned as Deputy Chief Minister to focus on her Education portfolio. She later resigned from her post as Minister for Education on 11 January 2021 following a disagreement with other Ministers over allowing students back to school during the COVID-19 pandemic.

The Children & Housing Minister, Sam Mézec resigned from his post on 9 November 2020 to back a vote of no confidence against Senator Le Fondré.

Deputy Jeremy Maçon took over the role of Minister for Children and Housing, which was later renamed 'Minister for Children and Education' (combining Senators Mézec and Vallois' previous roles) while a new position of 'Minister for Housing and Communities' was created. Maçon was relieved of his ministerial duties by the Chief Minister on 24 March 2021 and formally resigned three months later.

The Home Affairs Minister, Connetable Len Norman, died on 1 July 2021. His Assistant Minister, Deputy Gregory Guida, took over as Minister for Home Affairs. 

Assistant ministers

References 

Government of Jersey
Political organisations based in Jersey
Jersey
Jersey